Katra Gulab Singh is a regional market town in Pratapgarh district of Uttar Pradesh state of India.  It is about 30 km away from the Pratapgarh headquarters.

History

The Katra Gulab singh is very rich in glorious past.  Freedom of movement during the years of 1857 mutiny Taraul.  First great revolution in the Indian Mutiny of 1857 to the Amar Shaheed Babu Gulab Singh who sacrificed his all, history will always remember.  War Citaon take every year at the fair, the rest of those who die on country will mark determination to preserve in the chest area today Babu Gulab Singh of the people that were in their area. Babu Gulab Singh had delivered six of the British army.  Allahabad from Lucknow for the Suppression of the British soldiers were revolutionaries.  Then with his private army Mandhata area near village Katra Gulab Singh Bakulahi pitched battle on the river and had killed many Englishmen.  Bakulahi the water was red with the blood of British rulers.  The British army was forced to return.  Although many of his soldiers in the battle at Fort Continental soldiers had gunned down and his Queen.  Babu Gulab Singh was seriously injured in the encounter.  Lack of appropriate treatment are gaining momentum in the third day the immortal.  On the people of today are proud of their brave warriors.  His name was inhabited Katra Gulab Singh, the market still feel his shadow.

Geography

Katra Gulab Singh is located at  The town is situated on the bank of Bakulahi River.

Tourism

Bhayaharan nath Dham 

Bhayaharan nath Dham Temple is one of the important tourism destinations in the area. Bhayaharan Nath Dham is an ancient temple dedicated to Lord Shiva, situated in the village of Katra Gulab Singh, on the banks of Bakulahi River.  The temple enshrines a Shivling and it is believed that this Shivling was set up by the Pandavas at this place.  According to legends, the Shivling of Bhayaharan Nath was established by Bhima, after killing the demon Bakasura. The temple receives visitors from every corner of India.

Surya Mandir 
The ancient Surya Temple is adjacent to the Bhayaharan Nath Dham shrine.  The temple contains an idol of  Sun, Lord Buddha, Shivling, and other ruins of ancient stone in Surya mandir.  Local history says that Buddhist refugees came here.

Bakulahi Ghat 
The Bakulahi, an important and holy river, flows through the town. The river is mentioned in many old texts, most notably in Valmiki's Ramayana.

Education institutes 

 Amar Janta Intermediate College
 Model UPS Katra Gulab Singh
 Baba Sarvjeet Giri Memorial Intermediate College (Giri College)
 Hind Convent Public School
 Jauhar Modern English School
 A.T.S. Academy
 Saraswati Vidya Mandir
 Saray Bhoopati Primary School
 Bhimrao Ambedkar High School and College, Tarual
 Shri om Sai Computer Education and Training Center
 Sri Sri Ravi Sankar Gyan Mandir (Library)
 S P PUBLIC SCHOOL CHHITAHI KATRA GULAB SINGH PRATAPGARH
 S P ITI & LAW COLLEGE CHHITAHI KATRA GULAB SINGH PRATAPGARH

Transport
Katra Gulab Singh is connected by road with Allahabad, Lucknow, Kanpur, Delhi and many more North Indian cities. The nearest railway station is 12 km away at Mau Aima.

See also 

Amar Janta
Baba Sarvjeet Giri Memorial College
Bakulahi Bridge
Mandhata, Uttar Pradesh
Sardar Vallabhbhai Patel Chowk
Vishwanathganj

Gallery

References

External links 
 Katra gulab Singh Tourism website of Bhayaharan Nath Dham
 Katra gulab Singh on Google Map
 Official Website of Baba Sarvjeet Giri Memorial Inter Mediate College

Cities and towns in Pratapgarh district, Uttar Pradesh